Ilija Jovanović (1878–1913), known as Vojvoda Pčinjski, and by his nom de guerre Časlav, was a Chetnik commander active between 1904 and 1912, and a member of the Black Hand. He was schooled in Vranje, Paraćin, Kragujevac. He was among the first Chetniks on the Kozjak together with commanders Jovan Dovezenski, Krsta Preševski, Spasa Garda, Đorđe Skopljanče, Rista Starački and Vanđel Skopljanče. Vojvoda Pčinjski was the chief of one of the board of the Chetnik organization. He went from a battle to another until he was wounded in 1912. He died in the Belgrade Military Hospital, at the time when the Serbian Army liberated Bitola and broke out on the Adriatic.

See also
 List of Chetnik voivodes

References

Sources

People from the Kingdom of Serbia
Serbian military personnel
Chetniks of the Macedonian Struggle
People from Vranje
1878 births
1913 deaths
Serbian guerrillas